The Catholic Church in Jordan is part of the worldwide Catholic Church, under the spiritual leadership of the Pope in Rome.

There are approximately 114,000 Catholics in Jordan or 1.9% of the Jordanian population. Catholics are divided in four Rites:

80,000 Latin Catholics 

32,000 Melkite Catholics

1,500 Syrian Catholics

500 Armenian Catholics 

There are also thousands of Chaldean Catholics refugees from Iraq.

The whole of the country for all Melkites forms a single Archeparchy. 
Jordanian Catholics belonging to the Greek Catholic churches use the Melkite Rite, these are referred to as "Roum Catholiks" in Jordan (Roum or Rome referring to Byzantine, while those following the standard rites of the Catholic Church are referred to as "Lateen" and belong to the Latin Patriarch of Jerusalem.

Parishes
There are currently 33 Latin Catholic parishes in Jordan.
Melkite Greek Catholic Church has 28 parishes, Syrian Catholics have 3 parishes and Armenian Catholics has 2 churches. There are 66 Catholic parishes in all Jordan, belonging to four Catholic traditions.

See also
Religion in Jordan
Christianity in Jordan
St. Joseph's Church, Amman
Melkite Greek Catholic Church
Eastern Orthodoxy in Jordan
Freedom of religion in Jordan

References

External links
Profile of the Catholic Church in Jordan
popefrancisholyland2014.lpj.org

 
Jordan
Jordan